Fibrolite may refer to:

 one variety of the mineral Sillimanite
 house cladding sheets made from asbestos cement, widely used in Australia and New Zealand